Two Crowded Hours is a 1931 British comedy drama film directed by Michael Powell and starring John Longden, Jane Welsh, and Jerry Verno. It was made as a Quota quickie and is the first film where Powell is credited as the director. No known copies of the film have survived to the present day, and Two Crowded Hours has been declared to be "Missing, Believed Lost" by the British Film Institute.

Premise
A murderer is on the run from prison and is out to get everyone, especially the girl (Jane Welsh), who put him there. The detective (John Longden) gives chase with the help of a London cabbie (Jerry Verno) who has aspirations of becoming a policeman himself.

Cast
 John Longden as Harry Fielding
 Jane Welsh as Joyce Danton
 Jerry Verno as Jim
 Michael Hogan as Scammell
 Edward Barber as Tom Murray

Production
Michael Powell's first feature as director, Two Crowded Hours was produced by Jerry Jackson for the Film Engineering Company and distributed by the British arm of Fox Pictures. With accomplished players John Longden (star of Blackmail) and Cockney character actor Jerry Verno, shooting was completed in 12 days in April 1931 in and around London's Soho. "It was played for laughs and thrills", Powell said, "and we were paid £1 per foot by Fox. We got £4,000 on delivery so obviously we had to make it for £3,000". Although a few stills survive, there is no known print of Two Crowded Hours in existence.

Status
Two Crowded Hours has been declared to be "Missing, Believed Lost" by the British Film Institute.  It is listed as one of their "75 Most Wanted" lost films, along with two later Powell films The Price of a Song (1935) and The Man Behind the Mask (1936).

References

Notes

Bibliography

 Chibnal, Steve. Quota Quickies : The Birth of the British 'B' Film. London: BFI, 2007. 
 Powell, Michael. A Life in Movies: An Autobiography. London: Heinemann, 1986. .

External links

Two Crowded Hours reviews and articles at the Powell & Pressburger Pages
British Film Institute entry, including extensive notes

1931 films
1931 comedy-drama films
Films directed by Michael Powell
Films by Powell and Pressburger
Lost British films
British comedy-drama films
British black-and-white films
1931 lost films
Lost comedy-drama films
1931 directorial debut films
1930s English-language films
1930s British films
Films shot at Nettlefold Studios
Quota quickies
Films set in London